Daly River may refer to:
Daly River, Northern Territory, a town
Daly River (Northern Territory), a river